Mount McKerrow is a prominent mountain on the east side of Starshot Glacier, standing  north of Thompson Mountain in the Surveyors Range, Antarctica. It was discovered by the New Zealand Geological Survey Antarctic Expedition (1960–61) and named for James McKerrow, a former Surveyor General of New Zealand.

References

Mountains of Oates Land